Henrique José Monteiro de Mendonça  (4 February 1864 – 1 November 1942) was an influent Portuguese capitalist in Lisbon and important landowner in the Portuguese colony of São Tomé and Príncipe; he was one of the protagonists of the economic phenomenon that saw that colony turn into one of the world's main producers and exporters of cocoa in the early 20th century.

Henrique de Mendonça was President of the Portuguese Chamber of Commerce and Industry from 1911 to 1913, and, from 1930 to 1942, National President of the Portuguese Red Cross.

He commissioned architect Miguel Ventura Terra a mansion in the Avenidas Novas, a new area of the city of Lisbon created as it expanded north absorbing nearby rural areas and farmlands. The works lasted from 1900 to 1909 and, that year, the project received the prestigious Valmor Prize. Following its purchase in 2016 by the Ismaili Imamat, the Aga Khan IV officially designated the palace as the "Diwan of the Ismaili Imamat".

Distinctions

National orders
 Grand Officer of the Order of Christ (13 January 1920)
 Grand Cross of the Order of Merit (17 June 1933)
 Grand Officer of the Order of Public Instruction (24 May 1927)

References

1864 births
1942 deaths
19th-century Portuguese businesspeople
20th-century Portuguese businesspeople
Grand Crosses of the Order of Merit (Portugal)
Grand Officers of the Order of Christ (Portugal)
Portuguese landowners
19th-century landowners
20th-century landowners